The Hard Times of RJ Berger is an American television sitcom created by David Katzenberg and Seth Grahame-Smith for MTV. The show's central character is RJ Berger (Paul Iacono), an unpopular sophomore at the fictional Pinkerton High School in Ohio who is macrophallically-endowed. Berger's two best friends are Miles Jenner (Jareb Dauplaise), whose ambitions for popularity cause him to clash with Berger, and goth girl Lily Miran (Kara Taitz), who has been lusting after Berger for several years. Berger's love interest is Jenny Swanson (Amber Lancaster), a cheerleader who is involved with Max Owens (Jayson Blair), a popular jock and bully. The show is presented as a coming-of-age story and has been described by Katzenberg and Grahame-Smith as a blend of the television series The Wonder Years and the film Superbad.

The pilot episode premiered on June 6, 2010, and the first season of 12 episodes concluded August 23, 2010. MTV renewed The Hard Times of RJ Berger for a second season, which premiered on March 24, 2011 and concluded on May 30, 2011, but canceled the show that August.

Production
The Hard Times of RJ Berger originated from a short film with a similar premise titled The Tale of RJ, written and directed by David Katzenberg and produced by Seth Grahame-Smith. The Tale of RJ was described by The New York Times as "a short homage to Boogie Nights, about a well-endowed nerd" played by Christopher Mintz-Plasse. MTV executives were interested in developing scripted television series around the time Katzenberg and Grahame-Smith made their short film. In June 2009, MTV announced multiple series in development, including "Hard Times". It was described as "an irreverent half-hour coming-of-age series" in which unpopular fifteen-year-old RJ Berger becomes infamous when his "anatomical gift" is revealed to his school. Paul Iacono was cast as the title character that May.

Series creators Katzenberg and Grahame-Smith were the showrunners for both seasons, credited as executive producers. Grahame-Smith said "generally, David is concerned with visuals, running the set and designing the coverage, and I'm more concerned with making script changes and giving notes to actors, but those things cross-pollinate. I direct some episodes and David directs some episodes, but we're both there, every day. Even when we're not directing an episode, we have a couple directors that we really enjoy working with, on the series, and we're still involved, still bouncing things off the actors, and we're definitely making our presence felt, at all times, on set." The series was shot in a single-camera setup; each episode of the first season was shot in three and a half days, while each episode of the second season was shot in four days with two episodes being shot concurrently.

In regards to the content of the series, Grahame-Smith said that "it's an elevated, comedic world that this kid [RJ Berger] lives in, and he's surrounded by these absurd characters. He's surrounded by these archetypes, and he's the one semi-centered character in the middle of it all. I feel like, the more absurd that you are, the more you have to ground some things in reality. You have to earn that absurdity. Even though our show has one animated segment in every episode, even the live-action is like a cartoon, just with the way people carry on."

Cast and characters

Main
 Paul Iacono as Richard Junior "RJ" Berger, the eponymous protagonist; a socially awkward but good-hearted 15-year-old high school sophomore. He is in love with Jenny Swanson, but was too shy to proclaim his love for her, as he is afraid of her boyfriend, Max. He is forced into the limelight when during a basketball game, his shorts fall down and his large penis is exposed. He was originally reluctant to date because his large penis once caused a girl to choke while performing oral sex on him. After being exposed, he decides to take advantage of his popularity to win Jenny over. In the season 1 finale, he agrees to have sex with Lily, out of guilt. He and Jenny start dating in the second season, though their attempts at intimacy are regularly foiled by Max and a vengeful Lily. He and Jenny briefly break up and he begins dating Amy, his tutor. In the second season, he struggles with the fallout of his parents' divorce and is shocked to discover that he is the father of Lily's baby.
 Jareb Dauplaise as Miles Jenner, RJ's comical, immature, overweight best friend. He is obsessed with becoming popular and scoring with girls; he appears to be an antithesis to RJ's moral values. He often carries a video camera with him. When he discovers RJ's secret, he encourages RJ to use it to become popular so he can become popular too. He has a frenemy relationship with Lily and is constantly insulting her physical appearance. He suffered a number of losses early in life, including the death of his mother and the "suicide" of his cat. He also has an older brother named Chet, who is shown to be a crazy Iraq War veteran. He lost his virginity to a substitute teacher which resulted in him catching crabs.
 Kara Taitz as Lily Miran, a socially awkward, and sex-obsessed girl who is infatuated with RJ and constantly chases him, much to his dismay. She has an unusual fashion sense and is frequently dyeing her hair; it is revealed that she makes her own clothes in episode 11. She and Miles constantly antagonize one another. RJ asks Lily to the school dance, much to her delight, but she was hit by a bus before the dance. Out of pity, RJ agrees to have sex with her. After she finds out RJ and Jenny are dating, Lily tries to sabotage their relationship at any cost. She and RJ eventually rekindle their friendship; she even sparks a friendship with Jenny. Lily briefly dates Hamilton but reveals to RJ that she is pregnant with his baby in the final minutes of Season 2, setting up for a non-existent Season 3.
 Jayson Blair as Max Owens, an arrogant and obnoxious school jock and RJ's main antagonist. After RJ stood up to him in the first episode, Max swore to humiliate RJ at all costs as a punishment. He was Jenny's boyfriend in the first season and is aware of RJ's crush on her, which makes him jealous. In the season finale, just as Max is about to fight RJ for kissing Jenny, Miles tackles him and starts punching him repeatedly in the testicles, giving RJ the chance to leave. When RJ and Jenny begin dating, he dates Robin Pretnar, Jenny's best friend and head cheerleader. In the second season, RJ discovers that Max is secretly gay and RJ agrees to keep his secret.
 Amber Lancaster as Jenny Swanson, RJ's primary love interest; a beautiful, popular, and down-to-earth cheerleader. She is impressed with RJ after he stands up to her boyfriend, Max, and by RJ's overall kindness. In the season finale, RJ and Jenny share a kiss before a concerned RJ returns to Lily's hospital bed. She and RJ begin a relationship in season two although they eventually break up, due to the fact they have no similar interests and Jenny was upset to find out that RJ lost his virginity to Lily. They agree to be just friends. They team up together to be Mr. and Mrs. Pinkerton, with little romantic tension.
 Beth Littleford and Larry Poindexter (season 2; recurring season 1) as Suzanne and Richard Berger, RJ's parents. They fail to level with their son and will sometimes embarrass him even when they try to make him feel better. They are also portrayed as sexually adventurous. At the end of the season 2 premiere, they tell RJ they are getting a divorce. Suzanne begins a relationship with Jeriba Sinclair until Rick shows back up and woos her with the poem he wrote the first time they had sex. Rick and Suzanne make up in the end of the second season but it is unclear if they are back together.
 Marlon Young (season 2; recurring season 1) as Jeriba Sinclair, Pinkerton High's basketball coach and gym teacher; he is also RJ's guidance counselor, though he is very sarcastic and unsupportive and gives RJ questionable advice. He begins to date Suzanne after she and Rick separate in the season 2 premiere, much to RJ's disgust. However, as he dates Suzanne, he is much kinder to RJ. Jeriba eventually asks Suzanne to marry him but she leaves him to get back together with Rick. Afterwards, he resumes bullying RJ.

Recurring
 Crystal Reed as Renee (season 1), one of the mean girls of college, with whom Miles flirted when she needed him to teach her how to act to have a main role in a theater piece
 Ciena Rae as Robin Pretnar, Jenny's best friend and fellow cheerleader. She is the object of Miles' affections, much to her disgust. After he spread a rumor that he motorboated her breasts, she beat him up. She becomes Max's girlfriend in season two and claims to be the status of the school's "queen bee". She is cruel, snobbish, and domineering towards the other cheerleaders except Jenny. Max breaks up with her when he overhears her calling him stupid.
 Caitlin Crosby as Amy, RJ's math tutor, introduced towards the middle of season 2. She has a "geek-chic" vibe, and is relaxed and down-to-earth. RJ is assigned to be tutored by her when his grades drop, and chemistry between the two develops. RJ asks her out to a Weezer concert, and they kiss. They eventually have sex but she becomes jealous when she finds out that RJ and Jenny are running for Mr. and Mrs. Pinkerton together. However, she forgives RJ when he proclaims his love for her. 
 De'Vaughn Nixon as Hamilton, a "gangster" student who first appears in Season 1 as a one-time character, and then becomes a recurring one in Season 2 when he starts dating Lily after they meet in school therapy. He is extremely smart (having an IQ of 170), and is actually very nice.
 Adam Cagley as Kevin Stern, an overweight, indolent nerd who is acquaintances with RJ and Miles although neither can stand him. He uses a mechanical chair to move himself. He is also a member of the Model United Nations Club. When RJ and Miles fight, he becomes Miles' new best friend temporarily. At the season 2 premiere, in which he had died when his scooter accidentally crashed in a donut shop window, he was revealed by RJ to be adopted by a black couple at his funeral.

Guest
 Lori Alan as Linda Robbins
 Vered Blonstein as goth girl
 Kristopher Higgins as Mario
 JC Gonzalez as dancer with dagger
 Justin Cone as Guillermo
 Salar Ghajar as Trent
 Jim Hanna as Bill Robbin
 John Colton as Mister Levy
 Albert Kuo as Asian kid

Episodes

Series overview

Season 1 (2010)

Season 2 (2011)

Reception

Critical response  
The Hard Times of RJ Berger was described—by its creators and critics alike—as a cross between the teen-oriented television comedy-drama The Wonder Years (1988–1993) and the comedy film Superbad (2007). Brian Lowry of Variety wrote that beyond the crass concept, the show is otherwise "a fairly standard high school-outcast tale", adding that fortunately for MTV "the show's derivative nature will be lost on a target audience barely in diapers during the initial run of 'Wonder Years'."

Robert Lloyd of the Los Angeles Times wrote that "[a]side from a few novel details, MTV's latest is a by-the-book geek sex comedy for the Apatow Generation. In other words, a likely hit."
Barry Garron of The Hollywood Reporter wrote that "even with its abundance of stereotypical characters", The Hard Times of RJ Berger "is endearing and relatable to its target demo[graphic]" and drew parallels between its characters and those of the sitcom The Many Loves of Dobie Gillis.
Willa Paskin of New York magazine thought that the show's premise was faulty, noting that an enormous penis is unlikely to have much effect on your social life in high school.

Ratings
The pilot episode of The Hard Times of RJ Berger premiered on MTV after the 2010 MTV Movie Awards on June 6, 2010. The debut generated 2.6 million viewers, making it MTV's most-watched series launch in the 12–34 age demographic since 2008.

Viewership for the series' second season ranged between just 765,000 and 1.37 million viewers with the series finale having 865,000 viewers.

Media information
The first season of The Hard Times of RJ Berger was released on DVD through Amazon.com August 23, 2010.

References

External links
 
 The Hard Times of RJ Berger at MuchMusic.com

2010 American television series debuts
2011 American television series endings
2010s American high school television series
2010s American LGBT-related comedy television series
2010s American sex comedy television series
2010s American single-camera sitcoms
2010s American teen sitcoms
English-language television shows
MTV original programming
Television series about teenagers
Television series by DHX Media
Television shows set in Ohio